I Was There may refer to:
 "I Was There", a song by Green Day from their 1990 album 39/Smooth
 "I Was There", a song by Dwight Yoakam and Buck Owens from Yoakam's 2001 album Tomorrow's Sounds Today
 "I Was There (And I'm Told I Had a Good Time)", a song by The Monkees from their 2016 album Good Times!
 I Was There, a 2016 film directed by Jorge Valdés-Iga